Béla Bugár (born 7 July 1958) is a Slovak politician of Hungarian ethnicity. He was a member of the Slovak parliament from 1992 to 2020, briefly serving as its acting Speaker in 2006. He was the former leader of the political party Most–Híd.

Life and career 
He was the leader of Party of the Hungarian Coalition from 1998 until 2007, with Pál Csáky as his successor. Before the formation of the Party of the Hungarian Coalition in 1998, Bugár was the chairman of the Hungarian Christian Democratic Movement. Bugár has been an MP of the National Council of the Slovak Republic since 1992. He was its acting speaker from 7 February 2006 to 4 July 2006. Béla Bugár announced that he was going to retire from politics by 2010. However, on 30 June 2009 he founded a new political party, Most–Híd, whose goal is to stand for the Hungarians' interests in Slovakia while striving to work together with Slovaks.

References

External links 
 Béla Bugár's English language profile at Presseurop

1958 births
Hungarians in Slovakia
Living people
Party of the Hungarian Community politicians
Politicians from Bratislava
Most–Híd politicians
Speakers of the National Council (Slovakia)
Members of the National Council (Slovakia) 1992-1994
Members of the National Council (Slovakia) 1994-1998
Members of the National Council (Slovakia) 1998-2002
Members of the National Council (Slovakia) 2002-2006
Members of the National Council (Slovakia) 2006-2010
Members of the National Council (Slovakia) 2010-2012
Members of the National Council (Slovakia) 2012-2016
Members of the National Council (Slovakia) 2016-2020
Candidates for President of Slovakia
Slovak University of Technology in Bratislava